is a Japanese singer and songwriter from Yokohama, Kanagawa, Japan.

History
While Yonekura was attending university, she sent off several demonstration tapes to recording companies. She was scouted out, and received the opportunity to do the opening song "Arashi no Naka de Kagayaite" for the anime Mobile Suit Gundam: The 08th MS Team, as well as the ending song, "10 Years After". She debuted with a single containing both, which was successful. That same year she released three other singles and an album. Yonekura quickly gained a large fan base, and many shows selected her songs for opening and ending themes. She has now been singing and touring for 10 years. To celebrate her success, she released an album in 2005 entitled Cheers.

Discography

Singles

 2011-02-23: Naked Soul (TOPGUN x Chihiro Yonekura) (PSP/Wii game "SD Gundam G Generation World" Opening)
 2010-12-22: Seize the Days (Online game "Emil Chronicle Online" 5th anniversary song)
 2008-02-28: Home
 2007-03-14: Lion no Tsubasa (PS2 game Elvandia Story Theme song)
 2006-06-21: Aozora to Kimi e
 2006-01-12: ALIVE (Senkaiden Houshin Engi image song)
 2005-07-06: Towa no Hana (Fushigi Yuugi Genbu Kaiten Gaiden: Kagami no Fujo PS2 Opening & Ending)
 2005-02-23: Boku no Speed de (Mahoraba Heartful days Ending theme)
 2004-01-15: Hoshi ni Naru made
 2003-07-24: Yakusoku no Basho e (Kaleido Star theme song)
 2003-01-22: Omoide ga Ippai
 2002-09-25: Bridge (Gakuen Toushi Valanoir Opening & Ending)
 2002-08-22: Natsu no Owari no Hanabi
 2002-01-30: Hidamari o Tsurete
 2001-10-31: Butterfly Kiss (GROOVE ADVENTURE RAVE Opening Theme)

 2001-07-25: Little Soldier (Jikkyō Powerful Pro Yakyū 8 Image song)
 2000-08-23: Hi no Ataru Basho / c/w WILL (acoustic version) (Senkaiden Houshin Engi character song Self-Cover)
 2000-07-26: Return to myself( Rokumon Tengai Moncolle Knight Opening & Ending 2)
 2000-02-02: Just Fly Away (Rokumon Tengai Moncolle Knight Opening & Ending 1)
 1999-09-16: FEEL ME (Dreamcast game Revive ~Sosei~ Theme song)
 1999-08-25: WILL (Senkaiden Houshin Engi Opening theme)
 1999-01-08: Birth of light (High School Aura Buster OVA Theme song)
 1998-07-23: Eien no Tobira (Mobile Suit Gundam: 08th MS Team: Miller's Report OVA Theme song)
 1998-02-04: Strawberry Fields
 1997-05-21: Yukai na Kodou (Kiko-chan Smile Theme song)
 1997-02-21: Mirai no Futari ni (Mobile Suit Gundam: 08th MS Team Insert song)
 1996-12-05: Yakusoku
 1996-10-23: Orangeiro no Kiss o Ageyou
 1996-06-21: Believe ~anata dake utsushitai~
 1996-01-24: Arashi no Naka de Kagayaite (Mobile Suit Gundam: The 08th MS Team Opening & Ending)

Albums

 2011-03-16: Nakeru Anison
 2010-12-08: Voyager (15th Anniversary Best Album)
 2009-09-30: Departure
 2008-06-25: Ever After (anime cover album)
 2007-04-25: Kaleidoscope
 2006-02-08: Fairwings
 2005-02-23: Cheers
 2004-05-26: BEST OF CHIHIROX
 2004-02-26: azure

 2003-02-26: Spring ~start on a journey~
 2002-03-13: jam
 2001-02-21: Little Voice
 2000-10-25: apples
 1999-11-03: Colours
 1998-08-21: always
 1997-06-21: Transistor Glamour
 1996-07-05: Believe

Other
 Mobile Suit Gundam: The 08th MS Team OST 2, Miller's Report
 Mobile Suit Gundam: The 08th MS Team OST 1

References

External links

  
  

1972 births
Living people
Japanese women singer-songwriters
People from Yokohama
Musicians from Kanagawa Prefecture
20th-century Japanese women singers
20th-century Japanese singers
21st-century Japanese women singers
21st-century Japanese singers